The Norfolk County Council election took place on 1 May 1997, coinciding with local elections for county councils in England and the 1997 general election.

The Council remained under No Overall Control. The Conservatives won the most seats, gaining 2, although Labour (who also gained 2) narrowly outpolled them in share of the vote, the Liberal Democrats lost 3 seats and the only independent lost their seat.

Summary of results

|-bgcolor=#F6F6F6
| colspan=2 style="text-align: right; margin-right: 1em" | Total
| style="text-align: right;" | 84
| colspan=5 |
| style="text-align: right;" |
| style="text-align: right;" | 
|-

References

1997 English local elections
1997
20th century in Norfolk